Yue Kaixian (pinyin: Yuè Kāixiān; Wade-Giles: Yue K'ai-hsien) (1883 – 1990) was a politician in the Republic of China. Another art-name was Pijiang. He was born in Chengdu, Sichuan.

Biography 
Yue Kaixian claimed that he was descended from Yue Fei who was a hero in Southern Song Dynasty. From 1933 until February 1936, Yue Kaixian worked as the Foreign Ministry's Special Negotiator to Chahar (at that time, the Chairperson of Chahar was Song Zheyuan).

Later Yue Kaixian participated in the Provisional Government of the Republic of China. In January 1939 he was appointed Director to the Foreign Affairs Bureau of the Administrative Council of the same Government. In March 1940 the Wang Jingwei regime was established, he was appointed Chief to the General Office for Business which post he held until November 1943.

After that the whereabouts of Yue Kaixian were unknown.

References

Footnotes 
 
 

Politicians from Chengdu
Foreign Ministers of the Republic of China
Chinese collaborators with Imperial Japan
1883 births
Year of death uncertain
Republic of China politicians from Sichuan